Shikhany (Şixan) is a rural locality (a village) in Alataninsky Selsoviet, Sterlitamaksky District, Bashkortostan, Russia. The population was 321 as of 2010. There are 5 streets.

Geography 
Shikhany is located 19 km northeast of Sterlitamak (the district's administrative centre) by road. Urnyak is the nearest rural locality.

References 

Rural localities in Sterlitamaksky District